Beatrice is a female given name. The English variant is derived from the French Béatrice, which came from the Latin Beatrix, which means "blessed one".

Beatrice is also the Italian language version of Beatrix. The Spanish and Portuguese form is Beatriz. The popularity of Beatrice spread because of Dante Alighieri's poetry about the Florentine woman Beatrice Portinari. Dante presents Beatrice as being worthy of speaking for God, making her a holy individual.

The name is rising in popularity in the United Kingdom. It is also gaining popularity in the United States, where it ranked as the 691st most popular name for baby girls born in 2012. In 2009, it was the 45th most common baby name for girls born in Romania.

Name variants 

Alternate versions of the name include

 Beata (Polish, Swedish)
 Beate (German, Norwegian)
 Betha (Irish)
 Beatrica (Croatian, Slovakian)
 Beatriçe (Albanian)
 Béatrice (French)
 Beatrice (Italian)
 Beatričė (Lithuanian)
 Beatrijs (Dutch)
 Beatrika (Slovene)
 Βεατρίκη (Veatriki) (Greek)
 Beatris (English)
 Beatrisa (Latvian)
 Beatrise (Latvian)
 Beatričė (Lithuanian)
 Beatriss (English)
 Beatriu (Catalan)
 Beatrix (Latin)
 Béatrix (French)
 Beatriz (Galician, Portuguese, Spanish)
 Beatrycze (Polish)
 Beitris (Scottish Gaelic)
 Betrys (Welsh)

Short forms include

 Bea (Italian, Dutch, English, German, Galician, Spanish, Catalan)
 Béa (French)
 Beah (English)
 Beasie (English)
 Beat (English, Polish)
 Beatie (English)
 Beato (English)
 Bee (English)
 Betty (Spanish)
 Bia (Portuguese)
 Bice (Italian)
 Trix (Dutch, English)
 Trixi (English, German)
 Trixie (English)
 Trixy (English)
 Tris (English)

Beatrice

Artists and entertainers

Actresses 

 Beatrice Alda (born 1961), American actress and filmmaker
 Bea Arthur (1922–2009), American actress and comedian
 Mademoiselle Beatrice, stage name of Marie Beatrice Binda (1839–1878), Italian-born actress in England
 Beatrice Colen (1948–1999), American actress
 Bebe Neuwirth (born 1958), American actress
 Beatrice Roberts (1905–1970), American actress
 Beatrice Rosen (born 1984), French-American actress
 Beatrice Winde (1924–2004), American actress

Other 

 Beatrice Gjertsen Bessesen (1886–1935), American operatic soprano
 Beatritz de Dia, Provençal poet and musician
 Beatrice Hastings, pen-name of English writer, poet and literary critic Emily Alice Haigh (1879–1943), lover of Modigliani
 Beatrice Partridge (1866 - 1963), English-born New Zealand painter
 Béatrice Poulot (born 1968), French singer from Réunion
 Beatrice Redpath (1886-1937), Canadian poet, short story writer
 Beatrice (singer), singer in the Eurovision Song Contest 1999
 Beatrice Laus (born 2000), Filipino-British singer-songwriter and guitarist

Athletes 

 Beatrice Câșlaru (born 1975), Romanian former swimmer
 Beatrice Faumuina (born 1974), New Zealand world champion discus thrower
 Beatrice Jepchumba (born 1983), Kenyan long-distance runner
 Beatrice Lanza (born 1982), Italian triathlete
 Béatrice Mouthon (born 1966), French triathlete
 Beatrice Utondu (born 1969), Nigerian former sprinter

Politicians and public servants 

 Beatrice Aitchison (1908–1997), Director of Transportation Research in the Bureau of Transportation of the United States Postal Service
 Beatrice Anna Lewis (suffragette) (1889 - 1976), British suffragette, member of the militant Women's Social and Political Union.
 Béatrice Bellamy (born 1966), French politician
 Beatrice Hall (1921–2018), American politician
 Beatrice Lorenzin (born 1971) Italian politician
 Beatrice Serota, Baroness Serota (1919–2002), British Government minister and a Deputy Speaker of the House of Lords
 Beatrice Trew (1897-1976), Canadian socialist politician
 Beatrice Wishart (born 1955), British politician
 Beatrice Wright (1910–2003), American-born British politician

Religious figures 

 Beatrix or Beatrice, Christian martyr; see Simplicius, Faustinus and Beatrix
 Saint Beatrice d'Este (1191–1226), Italian Roman Catholic saint
 Beatrice of Silva (1424–1492), Portuguese nun and saint
 Blessed Beatrice of Nazareth (1200-1268), Flemish nun
 Blessed Beatrice of Ornacieux (ca. 1240–1306/1309), French nun and religious leader

Scientists, engineers and academics 

 Beatrice M. Hinkle (1874–1953), American pioneering feminist, psychoanalyst and writer
 Beatrice Krauss (1903–1998), American botanist
 Beatrice Rivière, French applied mathematician
 Beatrice Shilling (1909–1990), British aeronautical engineer and motorcyclist
 Beatrice Tinsley (1941–1981), New Zealand astronomer and cosmologist
 Beatrice Webb (1858–1943), English sociologist, economist, socialist, labour historian and social reformer
 Beatrice Casartelli (2004–), Fashion star, Sigma Kappa Sister for Life, Can't do 18.02 PS1 by herself

Aristocrats 

 Beatrice of Albon  (1161–1228), French Countess of Albon and Dauphine of Viennois
 Beatrice of England (1242–1275), daughter of Henry III of England and Eleanor of Provence
 Beatrice of Naples (fl. 1476–1500), queen of Hungary, also known as Beatrix of Aragon
 Beatrice of Portugal (disambiguation)
 Beatrice of Savoy (disambiguation)
 Princess Beatrice (disambiguation)
 Beatrice Plummer, Baroness Plummer (1903–1972), British life peer
 Beatrice Cenci (1577–1599), Italian noblewoman who, with other members of her family, murdered her rapist father
 Beatrice Borromeo (1985), Italian noblewoman and journalist who is currently married to Pierre Casiraghi.

Miscellaneous 

 Beatrice Portinari (1265–1290), great love and muse of poet Dante Alighieri
 Beatrice Beeby (1904–1991), New Zealand educator
 Beatrice Warde (1900–1969), American expert on typography
 Beatrice McCartney, Paul McCartney's daughter with Heather Mills

Fictional characters 

 Beatrice (inspired by Beatrice Portinari), the guide through Paradise in Dante's Divina Commedia
 Beatrice, in William Shakespeare's Much Ado About Nothing
 Beatrice Baudelaire, in A Series of Unfortunate Events
 Beatrice Carbone, one of the cast of characters in A View from the Bridge, a play by Arthur Miller
 Bia Gunderson, a young female Spix's Macaw character in the 2014 animatied movie Rio 2.
 Beatrice Hotchkiss, in the Nancy Drew: Treasure in the Royal Tower and Nancy Drew: Legend of the Crystal Skull
 Beatrice "Tris" Prior, the main character in the Divergent series of books and movies
 Beatrice Rappaccini, title character of Nathaniel Hawthorne's short story "Rappaccini's Daughter"
 Beatrice Rumfoord, in Kurt Vonnegut's novel The Sirens of Titan
 Beatrice Severn, in Graham Greene's novel Our Man in Havana
 Beatrice, the Dream Demon in the Sony PlayStation roleplaying game Wild Arms 3
 Beatrice, the Endless and Golden Witch in Umineko no Naku Koro ni
 Beatrice, in the manga Gunslinger Girl
 Beatrice (Re:Zero), a character in the light novel series Re:Zero − Starting Life in Another World
 Beatrice Grimaldi, a princess in the television series Gossip Girl
 Beatrice, a bluebird in the 2014 animated television miniseries Over the Garden Wall
 Beatrice The Bear Leep, from Carl Hiaasen's 2002 novel Hoot and played by Brie Larson in its 2006 film adaptation
 Beatrice Scarlet, heroine of "Scarlet Widow' and "The Coven' novels by Graham Masterton
 Beezus "Beezus" Quimby, character in the Ramona Series by Beverly Cleary
 Beatrice "Bea" Santello, a major character in the 2017 adventure game Night in the Woods
 Beatrice "Aunt Bee" Taylor - a major character from the 1960s American sitcom The Andy Griffith Show.
 Beatrice "Trixie" Espinoza - secondary character in the TV/streaming series "Lucifer (TV series)"

See also 

 Beatrijs, a 13th-century Dutch poem about a nun with this name
 Beatrix
 Beatriz

References

External links 

 Beatrice at Behindthename.com
 Beatrice at Ancestry.com

English feminine given names
Italian feminine given names
Romanian feminine given names